Anti-Indian sentiment, also known as Indophobia or anti-Indianism, is a modern term referring to negative feelings, fear and hatred towards the Republic of India, Indian people, and Indian culture. Indophobia is formally defined in the context of anti-Indian prejudice as "a tendency to react negatively towards people of Indian extraction, against aspects of Indian culture and normative habits".

Historic anti-Indian sentiment
Anti-Asian feelings and xenophobia had already emerged in North America in response to Chinese immigration and the cheap Asian labor which it supplied, mostly for railroad construction in California and elsewhere on the West Coast. In the common jargon of the day, ordinary workers, newspapers and politicians opposed immigration from Asia. The common desire to remove Asians from the workforce inspired the rise of the Asiatic Exclusion League.

During the era of the British Raj, when the Indian community of mostly Punjabi Sikhs settled in California, the xenophobia expanded to encompass immigrants from the Indian subcontinent.

Colonial period

Indologists
The relationship between Indomania and Indophobia in the colonial era British Indology was discussed by American Indologist Thomas Trautmann (1997) who found that Indomania had become a norm in early 19th century Britain as the result of a conscious agenda of Evangelicalism and utilitarianism, especially by Charles Grant and James Mill. Historians noted that during the British Empire, "evangelical influence drove British policy down a path that tended to minimize and denigrate the accomplishments of Indian civilization and to position itself as the negation of the earlier British Indomania that was nourished by belief in Indian wisdom."

In Grant's highly influential "Observations on the ... Asiatic subjects of Great Britain" (1796), he criticized the Orientalists for being too respectful to Indian culture and religion. His work tried to determine the Hindus' "true place in the moral scale" and he alleged that the Hindus are "a people exceedingly depraved". Grant believed that Great Britain's duty was to civilise and Christianize the natives.

Lord Macaulay, serving on the Supreme Council of India between 1834 and 1838, was instrumental in creating the foundations of bilingual colonial India. He convinced the Governor-General to adopt English as the medium of instruction in higher education from the sixth year of schooling onwards, rather than Sanskrit or Arabic. He claimed: "I have never found one among them who could deny that a single shelf of a good European library was worth the whole native literature of India." He wrote that Arabic and Sanskrit works on medicine contain "medical doctrines which would disgrace an English Farrier – Astronomy, which would move laughter in girls at an English boarding school – History, abounding with kings thirty feet high reigns thirty thousand years long – and Geography made up of seas of treacle and seas of butter".

One of the most influential historians of India during the British Empire, James Mill was criticised for prejudice against Hindus. Horace Hayman Wilson wrote that the tendency of Mill's work was "evil". Mill claimed that both Indians and Chinese people are cowardly, unfeeling and mendacious. Both Mill and Grant attacked Orientalist scholarship that was too respectful of Indian culture: "It was unfortunate that a mind so pure, so warm in the pursuit of truth so devoted to oriental learning, as that of Sir William Jones, should have adopted the hypothesis of a high state of civilization in the principal countries of Asia."

Dadabhai Naoroji spoke against such anti-India sentiment.

Colonialists
Stereotypes of Indians intensified during and after the Indian Rebellion of 1857, known as India's First War of Independence to the Indians and as the Sepoy Mutiny to the British, when Indian sepoys rebelled against the British East India Company's rule in India. Allegations of war rape were used as propaganda by British colonialists in order to justify the colonization of India. While incidents of rape committed by Indian rebels against British women and girls were generally uncommon, this was exaggerated by the British media to justify continued British intervention in the Indian subcontinent.

At the time, British newspapers had printed various apparently eyewitness accounts of British women and girls being raped by Indian rebels, but cited little physical evidence. It was later found that some were fictions created to paint the native people as savages who needed to be civilized, a mission sometimes known as "The White Man's Burden". One such account published by The Times, regarding an incident where 48 British girls as young as 10–14 had been raped by Indian rebels in Delhi, was criticized by Karl Marx, who pointed out that the story was propaganda written by a clergyman in Bangalore, far from the events. A wave of anti-Indian vandalism accompanied the rebellion.  When Delhi fell to the British, the city was ransacked, the palaces looted and the mosques desecrated in what has been called "a deliberate act of unnecessary vandalism".

Despite the questionable authenticity of colonial accounts regarding the rebellion, the stereotype of the Indian "dark-skinned rapist" occurred frequently in English literature of the late 19th and early 20th centuries. The idea of protecting British "female chastity" from the "lustful Indian male" had a significant influence on the British Raj's policies outlawing miscegenation between the British and the Indians. While some restrictive policies were imposed on British females to "protect" them from miscegenation, most were directed against Indians. For example, the 1883 Ilbert Bill, which would have granted Indian judges the right to judge British offenders, was opposed by many British colonialists on the grounds that Indian judges could not be trusted in cases alleging the rape of British females.

Regional anti-India sentiment

South Asia
Pakistan was part of British India (before 1947) and is the location of the Indus Valley civilization  many thousands of years ago . However Anti-Indian and anti-Hindu sentiments have waxed and waned in the country since its independence. According to Tufts University professor Seyyed Vali Reza Nasr, anti-India sentiment in Pakistan increased with the ascendancy of the Islamist Jamaat-e-Islami under Sayyid Abul Ala Maududi.

Historic 
Some Indian Muslims feared the Hindu majority that would gain political ascendance after independence from the British Raj. This view was bolstered by religious riots in British India such as the 1927 Nagpur riots. The Two-Nation Theory was enunciated by Allama Iqbal, which was supported by the All India Muslim League and eventually culminated in the independence from British colonial rule of both India and of Pakistan in 1947.

Violence at the time of the partition of India and even prior led to communal tensions and enmity among Hindus and Muslims. In Pakistan, this contributed to Indophobia. In an interview with Indian news channel CNN-IBN Pakistani cricketer and politician Imran Khan said in 2011: "I grew up hating India because I grew up in Lahore and there were massacres of 1947, so much bloodshed and anger. But as I started touring India, I got such love and friendship there that all this disappeared."

The Two-Nation Theory is predicated on the belief that at the time of Partition, the Indian Subcontinent was not a nation and in its extreme interpretation, it postulates the belief that Indian Hindus and Indian Muslims constituted nations which cannot co-exist "in a harmonious relationship".

According to Husain Haqqani, Pakistan faced multiple challenges to its survival after partition. At the time Pakistan's secular leaders decided to use Islam as a rallying cry against perceived threats from predominantly Hindu India. Unsure of Pakistan's future, they deliberately promoted anti-Indian sentiment with "Islamic Pakistan" resisting a "Hindu India".

According to Nasr, Anti-Indian sentiments, coupled with anti-Hindu prejudices have existed in Pakistan since its formation. With the ascendancy of the Jamaat-e-Islami under Maududi, Indophobia increased in Pakistan.

Commenting on Indophobia in Pakistan in 2009 former United States Secretary of State, Condoleezza Rice termed the Pakistan-India relationship as shadowed by Indophobia.

In his article "The future of Pakistan" published by Brookings Institution American South Asia expert Stephen P. Cohen describes the Pakistan-India relationship as a neverending spiral of sentiments against each other.

In Pakistani textbooks 

According to Sustainable Development Policy Institute since the 1970s Pakistani school textbooks have systematically inculcated hatred towards India and Hindus. According to this report, "Associated with the insistence on the Ideology of Pakistan has been an essential component of hate against India and the Hindus. For the upholders of the Ideology of Pakistan, the existence of Pakistan is defined only in relation to Hindus hence the Hindus have to be painted as negatively as possible".

A 2005 report by the National Commission for Justice and Peace, a nonprofit organization in Pakistan, found that Pakistan studies textbooks in Pakistan have been used to articulate the hatred that Pakistani policy-makers have attempted to inculcate towards the Hindus. "Vituperative animosities legitimize military and autocratic rule, nurturing a siege mentality. Pakistan Studies textbooks are an active site to represent India as a hostile neighbor", the report stated. "The story of Pakistan's past is intentionally written to be distinct from often in direct contrast with, interpretations of history found in India. From the government-issued textbooks, students are taught that Hindus are backward and superstitious." Further the report stated "Textbooks reflect intentional obfuscation. Today's students, citizens of Pakistan and its future leaders are the victims of these blatant lies."

Military conflicts 

India and Pakistan have had numerous military conflicts which have caused anti-Indian sentiment, with the Kashmir conflict being the most prominent and important one.

In 1971 rising political discontent in East Pakistan, on the other side of India from West Pakistan, led to calls to secede from Pakistan, which were brutally suppressed by Pakistan Army leading to the Bangladesh Liberation War. India intervened, triggering the brief 1971 Indo-Pakistani war that culminated in Pakistan's defeat and the secession of East Pakistan which then became Bangladesh. According to Ardeshir Cowasjee in West Pakistan the region's political and military leadership whipped up anti-Indian sentiment with the slogan "crush India", in an attempt to convince the people that the only issue in East Pakistan was India's support of a secessionist movement.

Writing for Middle East Research and Information Project the Pakistani nuclear scientist Pervez Hoodbhoy stated that anti-Indian sentiment is instilled in Pakistani soldiers early in their training at Cadet College Hasan Abdal and Cadet College Petaro. He also claimed that in order to prosper, Pakistan needed to overcome its hatred of India.

Bangladesh
The Indo-Bangladeshi relationship began to sour within a few years. Political disputes such as the border killing by India, Farakka Barrage, Indo-Bangladesh enclaves and Indo-Bangladeshi barrier created rifts between the two countries. Indophobia coupled with anti-Hinduism, led to accusations of dual loyalty among Bangladeshi Hindus by right-wing Islamist extremist Bangladeshis.

Bhutan
Anti-India sentiments rose when the Indian government withdrew its subsidy for the kerosene and cooking gas to Bhutan in 2013 election process. Furthermore, anti-India sentiments have also been attributed to the insensitive comments by Indian diplomats and senior political figures. In August 2017 at the height of the India-China standoff in Doklam, former foreign secretary Shyam Saran's response was received negatively by the Bhutanese regarding Indian intervention in the expansion of Bhutan's foreign relations. He stated that "…it is really for Bhutan to decide what its comfort level is, in terms of expanding its own engagement with the rest of the world. The only thing which the Indian side would like to be assured of is that there should be no surprises in terms of the move that Bhutan makes. That is the only requirement." Bhutan was considered to have laid the foundation of democracy based on anti-India sentiments.

Misbehavior from some Indian tourists in Bhutan has led to complaints in local media, with the Bhutanese government responding by implementing a 'sustainable development' fee for regional visitors.

Maldives
Anti-India sentiments in Maldives rose when "India Out" hastag trended on Twitter in the Maldives on July 26, 2021, the Maldives’ Independence Day. Anti-India sentiments dates back when Abdulla Yameen was elected as the President of Maldives in 2013. During the government of Abdulla Yameen, two Dhruv Advanced Light Helicopters (ALF) helicopters based on Addu Atoll and Hanimaadhoo that were gifted by India to the Maldives coast guard were returned by the Yameen government citing military intervention and a threat to the sovereignty of Maldives. Furthermore, Yameen accused India developing intentions of state capture during the internal political turmoil in the country when former Maldives President Mohammed Nasheed solicited Indian intervention. According to Ahmed Azaan of the Maldivian online news organization Dhiyares, "...the "India Out" campaign is a call for the removal of the Indian military from the Maldives." Further, he tweeted that "..It is not a call to cut off diplomatic & trade relations with India" but the Maldives "should be able to forge ties with India without undermining our sovereignty." On 2 July 2021, the country's ruling party, the Maldivian Democratic Party (MDP), released an official statement citing "concern over the ill-founded and disparaging remarks against Indian diplomats". The MDP alleged that local news outlet Dhiyares and its co-founder and writer Ahmed Azaan, had involved in a "continuous barrage of anti-India vitriol" that "appears to be a well-funded, well-orchestrated and pre-meditated political campaign with the express purpose of whipping up hatred against the Maldives’ closest ally, India."

Nepal

Despite centuries long relation between the two nations, Nepal has clashed with India over different issues such as territorial disputes, dispute over the birthplace of Gautama Buddha, intervention on internal issues and for the support of Nepali ethnic unrest directly responsible for the 2015 Nepal blockade. The #BackoffIndia hashtag on Twitter was used by Nepalese supporters around the world, accusing the Indian Government of interfering in the country's internal matters.

Sri Lanka

	
Anti-Indian prejudice may be caused by the island nation's bad experience with Invasions by Tamil Indian Dynasties (such as the Chola dynasty), their ethnic tensions with Sri Lanka's Tamil minority, who are accused of loyalty to India, India's alleged support and training of the LTTE as well as massacres against Tamil Sri Lankan civilians committed by the Indian army denied by the Indians, such as the Jaffna hospital massacre.

Historical
During the defence against the invading Hindu Chola dynasty, the Sinhalese Resistance killed scores of Hindu Tamils as a retaliation for invading Sri Lanka.

20th century

Despite India's alliance with the Sri Lankan government during the Sri Lankan Civil War, anti-Indian views are fairly common among the ethnic Sinhalese, escalated by Buddhist Nationalism and militancy. Attitudes towards Tamils are associated with Indophobia and the Tamils were suspected of spying for the Indians. Indian traders and businessmen, patronized by the Tamil minority, have been shunned and attacked by the Sinhalese.

During the 1950s, discriminatory measures taken by the Sri Lankan government targeted Indian traders (typically from the Indian states of Tamil Nadu and Kerala), forcing the traders out of Sri Lanka. Following this, trade with India was deliberately scuttled, as was the sale of Indian magazines.

The Indophobia of that era led the Sri Lankan government to go after the so-called Tamils of 'recent' Indian origin. These immigrant plantation workers were imported by the British more than a hundred years earlier and had already been stripped of citizenship by earlier legislation—the first Legislative Act of the newly independent country in 1948. Since then, these Tamils lived as 'stateless' persons and many returned to India.
The IPKF's involvement in Sri Lanka led to the rise of the anti-Indian Patriotic People's Front.

During the Black July, rioters targeted Indian Tamils. During one instance, the Sri Lankan Bus Employees brutally killed seven Tamils including six members of the Ramanathan family (father, young daughter, three sons, and their uncle) and their driver, some of whom were bludgeoned to death.

Southeast Asia

Myanmar
Anti-Indian sentiment against the Indians during the British Raj began to rise in Burma after the First World War ended for a number of reasons. The country's ethnic Indian population was rapidly growing in Myanmar (almost half of Yangon's population was Indian by the Second World War). The Indians played a prominent role in the British administration and as a result, they began to be targeted for persecution by Burmese nationalists. Racial animosity towards Indians because of their skin-color and appearance also played a role. Meanwhile, the price of rice plummeted during the economic depression of the 1930s and the Chettiar from Tamil Nadu, who were prominent moneylenders in the rice belt, began to foreclose on land held by native Burmese.

In May 1930, a British-owned stevedore firm which operated at the port of Rangoon employed Burmese workers in an attempt to break a strike that was being organized by its Indian workers. When, on 26 May, the strike ended and the Indians returned to work, clashes soon broke out between the returning Indian workers and the Burmese workers who had replaced them. The clashes soon escalated into large-scale anti-Indian riots in the city, killing more than two hundred Indians and their dead bodies were flung into the river. Authorities ordered the police to fire upon any assembly of five or more who refused to lay down their arms, under Section 144 of the Criminal Procedure Code. Within two days the riot spread throughout the country to locations such as Maymyo.

After Burma achieved Independence, Burmese law treated a large percentage of the Indian community as "resident aliens". Though many had long ties to Burma or were born there, they were not considered citizens under the 1982 Burma citizenship law which restricted citizenship for groups immigrating before 1823.

After seizing power through a military coup in 1962, General Ne Win ordered a large-scale expulsion of Indians. Although many Indians had been living in Burma for generations and had integrated into Burmese society, they became a target for discrimination and oppression by the junta. This, along with a wholesale nationalization of private ventures in 1964, led to the emigration of over 300,000 ethnic Indians from Burma. Indian-owned businesses were nationalized and their owners were given 175 kyat for their trip to India. This caused a significant deterioration in Indian-Burmese relations and the Indian government arranged ferries and aircraft to lift Burmese of Indian ethnicities out of Burma.

Malaysia
On 28 June 1969, anti-Indian riots broke out in Sentul where Malays attacked and killed 15 Indians.

In March 2001, a 9-day period of communal violence known as the 2001 Kampung Medan riots occurred between Indians and Malays cost the deaths of 6 people and injuring many more people. The severity of injuries range from head injuries to severed limbs. The riots no doubt caused anti-Indian feelings among Malays residing in Selangor and Klang Valley.

The novel Interlok caused enormous controversial backlash for allegedly being anti-Indian as the book includes racist derogatory terms used to refer to the Indians such as "Pariah" and "black people". The novel also includes the usage of the term kasta pariah ("pariah caste"), which often refers to persons from the lowest caste in the Indian caste system.

On 26 November 2018, a riot launched by several group of peoples due to demolish purpose of 147-years-old Seafield Sri Mariamman Temple in Subang Jaya with death of Malaysian firefighter, 24-years-old, Mohammad Adib Mohd Kassim erupted anti-Indian sentiment including several politicians.

Singapore
In 2020, there were lots of discrimination towards migrant workers of Indian origin. There are also a number of locals who passed racist comments about them on Facebook.

East Asia

China 

Indian police officers dispatched to Hong Kong and Shanghai during the British colonial era were often discriminated against by local Chinese and were called "red-headed A’san" (红头阿三) because of the Sikh turban. Since the dispute between the two countries over the Tibet border erupted in the 1950s, the two sides have been fraught with mistrust.

Western Asia

Qatar 
Calls to boycott Indian products began trending on the Qatari Twitter after clips of Indian authorities attacking and evicting thousands of Muslims in Assam went viral. It led the Indian embassy in Qatar to tweet in response that there was a “malicious attempt on social media to spread hatred and disharmony through false propaganda about India”. A 'Boycott India' campaign also trended in June 2022 after controversial remarks were made against Prophet Muhammad by a couple of BJP members.

Africa

Kenya
Following the 1982 Kenyan coup d'état attempt to remove President Moi, many Indian shops and businesses in Nairobi were attacked and pillaged whilst a number of Indian women were said to have been raped by the rioters.

South Africa

The first anti-Indian commotion that took place in South Africa was the Durban riots in 1949 that took place in the South Africa's largest city Durban, where angry Black South Africans attacked and killed 142 Indians, destroyed and looted Indian property. 

Another anti-Indian riot took place again in Durban in 1985.

The influential leader Mahatma Gandhi experienced anti-Indian racism when he was in South Africa, he was beaten up by a driver for travelling in first class coach.
The Indians were not allowed to walk on public footpaths in South Africa and Gandhi was kicked by a police officer out of the footpath onto the street without warning.

In 2015, Phumlani Mfeka, a KwaZulu-Natal businessman and the spokesman for the radical Mazibuye African Forum tweeted "A good Indian is a dead Indian". He published a letter in the city press claiming that South Africans of Indian origin have no right to citizenship and property in South Africa. Mfeka also claimed there is a "ticking time bomb of a deadly confrontation" between Africans and Indians in KwaZulu-Natal. The South African court barred him from making anti-Indian remarks in Nov 2015.

In 2017, EFF leader Julius Malema stated during a rally in KwaZulu-Natal "They are ill-treating our people. They are worse than Afrikaners were. This is not an anti-Indian statement, it's the truth. Indians who own shops don't pay our people, but they give them food parcels", and accused local politicians of being in the pockets of Indian businesspeople. Malema also said that the success of Indian businesses in the province was due to their strategies of exploitation and monopolisation of the economy. Malema also referred to Indians in 2011 as 'coolies' (which is considered a strongly offensive pejorative term in contemporary South Africa).

In 2021, South African Indians were largely targeted during the 2021 South African unrest. Many Indians in Phoenix, KwaZulu-Natal have armed themselves to fight rioters in absences of police forces. Police Minister Bheki Cele stated that the main motive behind the Phoenix riots was criminal and that racial issues were secondary. He confirmed that 20 people had died in the town in the unrest. He also warned people against falling for fake news designed to increase racial tensions. The aftermath of the events saw influx of emigration of Indian communities from South Africa. The Beaver Canadian Immigration Consultants noted that immigration application for Indians has quadruple to 40 percent mainly from South Africa.

Uganda
The most infamous case of Indophobia is the ethnic cleansing of Indians and other South Asians (sometimes simply called "Asian") in Uganda by Idi Amin. (See Expulsion of Asians from Uganda.)

According to H.H. Patel, many Indians in East Africa and Uganda were tailors and bankers, leading to stereotyping.

Indophobia in Uganda also existed under Milton Obote, before Amin's rise. The 1968 Committee on "Africanisation in Commerce and Industry" in Uganda made far-reaching Indophobic proposals.

A system of work permits and trade licenses was introduced in 1969 to Indians' economic and professional activities. Indians were segregated and discriminated against in all walks of life. After Amin came to power, he exploited these divisions to spread propaganda against Indians.

Indians were stereotyped as "only traders" and thereby "inbred" to their profession. Indians were attacked as "dukawallas" (an occupational term that degenerated into an anti-Indian slur during Amin's time). They were stereotyped as "greedy, conniving", without racial identity or loyalty but "always cheating, conspiring and plotting" to subvert Uganda.

Amin used this to justify a campaign of "de-Indianisation", eventually resulting in the expulsion and ethnic cleansing of Uganda's Indian minority. Some 80,000 were expelled, leading about 25,000 to settle in the United Kingdom.

Pacific islands

Fiji
Anti-Indian riots broke out throughout Fiji amidst an attempted coup. Protesters attacked Indian shops.

Western world
Contemporary Indophobia has risen in the western world, particularly the United States, the United Kingdom, Canada, and others, on account of the rise of the Indian American community and the increase in offshoring of white-collar jobs to India by American multinational corporations.

Australia

In May and June 2009, racially motivated attacks against Indian international students and a perceived poor police response sparked protests. Rallies were held in both Melbourne and Sydney. Impromptu street protests were held in Harris Park, a suburb of western Sydney with a large Indian population. Representatives of the Indian government met with the Australian government to express concern and request that Indians be protected. Prime Minister Kevin Rudd expressed regret and called for the attackers to be brought to justice. The United Nations termed these attacks "disturbing" and the human rights commissioner Navi Pillay, herself a member of the Indian diaspora, asked Australia to investigate the matters further.

Some Facebook groups were set up with Indophobic leanings. The Rudd Government set up a task force to address a proposal to make sending a text message encouraging commission of a racial attack a federal offence. The group was headed by national security adviser Duncan Lewis. The proposed amendment would strengthen police powers to respond to attacks against Indian students. Internet-based racist commentary was able to continue because of protection afforded by privacy laws. The current system allows the commission to investigate complaints of racial vilification and then attempt to resolve complaints through conciliation with ISPs and site operators.

Canada
Anti-Indian sentiment among the white and other populations increased as the numbers of South Asian Canadians increased. It continues to increase even in present day.

Germany
India suffers from a severe image deficit in Germany.

In August 2007, a mob of over 50 persons attacked 8 Indians in Mügeln.

A 2014 BBC World Service Poll showed that 68% of Germans view India's influence negatively.

Poland
In 2022 an Indian man was racially abused by an American tourist in Poland by calling him parasites and genocide for European civilization.

United Kingdom
The Indian Rebellion of 1857 triggered mass anti-Indian sentiment amongst the British public as news of atrocities committed by Indian rebels against British civilians became increasingly widely known throughout the United Kingdom, resulting in large scale massacres against the Indians by British troops. The British troops killed about 150,000 Indians in Oudh alone, most of them civilians. Places such as Delhi, Allahabad, Kanpur and Lucknow were all met with general massacre after they were recaptured by British forces. One young officer was apparently recorded as saying "the orders were to shoot every soul ... it was literally murder."

British Prime Minister Winston Churchill also expressed his hatred and disgust of the Indians frequently throughout his political career. During the Bengal famine of 1943, when Churchill was confronted by some British officials to direct food supplies to save the starving Indians, Churchill replied by joking "Why hasn't Gandhi died yet?".

In October 2018, it was reported that Conservative Party candidate for the Mayor of London Shaun Bailey had written a pamphlet, entitled No Man's Land, for the Centre for Policy Studies. In it, Bailey claimed that South Asians "bring their culture, their country and any problems they might have, with them" and that this was not a problem within the Black community "because we've shared a religion and in many cases a language".

United States
Immigration from India to the United States became more frequent between 1907 and 1920 because of Canada's Immigration Act in 1910 which restricted the number of Indians coming into the country. California was where most Indians migrated to and Indian immigrants had a negative stigma around them.

Hatred of the Indians amongst Americans led to the Bellingham riots in 1907. In the late-1980s in New Jersey, an anti-Indian hategroup gang calling themselves the "Dotbusters" targeted, threatened and viciously beat Indians until they were in a coma and died or suffered brain damage. The former President Richard Nixon was found voicing disparaging remarks on Indians in a newly declassified White House tapes citing Indians as the "most sexless", "nothing" and "pathetic". He further remarks about Indian women as the "Undoubtedly the most unattractive women in the world are the Indian women. Undoubtedly."

Vamsee Juluri, author and Professor of Media Studies at the University of San Francisco, identifies Indophobia in certain sections of the US media as part of a racist postcolonial/neocolonial discourse used to attack and defame India and encourage racial prejudice against Indian Americans, particularly in light of India's recent economic progress, which some "old-school" colonialists find to be incompatible with their Clash of Civilizations world view. Juluri identified numerous instances of bias and prejudice against Indians in US media, such as The New York Times and Foreign Policy and attempts to erase and disparage the history of India in American school textbooks misrepresent the history of India during the California textbook controversy over Hindu history with the final verdict to retain the term "India" in Californian textbooks and to remove the disparaging contents from textbooks.

Latin America and the Caribbean

Caribbean
There is occasional anti-Indian discrimination amongst the locals of the Caribbean islands especially Trinidad and Tobago.

Guyana
Anti-Indian sentiments of Guyana sometimes becomes violent. Anti-Indian riots of Guyana saw the black population burn businesses belonging to the Indians, hundreds of Africans and Indians lost their lives rioting.

Media

BBC
In 2008, the BBC was criticised for referring to those who carried out the November 2008 Mumbai attacks as "gunmen", and not terrorists. Journalist M. J. Akbar chose to boycott the BBC when he spoke of the 2008 Mumbai attacks. British parliamentarian Stephen Pound referred to the BBC's alleged whitewashing of the attacks as "the worst sort of mealy mouthed posturing. It is desperation to avoid causing offence which ultimately causes more offence to everyone."

Writing for the 2008 edition of the peer-reviewed Historical Journal of Film, Radio and Television, Alasdair Pinkerton analysed BBC Indian coverage from independence through 2008. Pinkerton suggested a tumultuous history involving allegations of Indophobic bias, particularly during the cold war, and concludes that BBC coverage of South Asian geopolitics and economics shows pervasive Indophobic bias.

In the journal of the Institute for Defence Studies and Analyses, media analyst Ajai K. Rai strongly criticised the BBC for Indophobic bias. He found a lack of depth and fairness in BBC reporting on conflict zones in South Asia and that the BBC had, on at least one occasion, fabricated photographs while reporting on the Kashmir conflict to make India look bad. He claimed that the network made false allegations that the Indian Army stormed a sacred Muslim shrine, the tomb of Sheikh Noor-u-din Noorani in Charari Sharief, and only retracted the claim after strong criticism.

English journalist Christopher Booker has also criticized the BBC for its coverage of India-related matters. He concludes that the BBC's efforts to reinforce stereotypes of South Asians has been directly responsible for damaging the image of India, and encouraging racist incidents against Indians, such as the Leipzig University internship controversy.

New York Times
The newspaper's India coverage has been heavily criticized by scholars such as Sumit Ganguly, a professor of political science at Indiana University and member of the Council on Foreign Relations as well the London-based Institute of Strategic Studies. In a 2009 Forbes article, Ganguly faults the New York Times editorial board for its "hectoring" and "patronizing" tone towards India. He finds anti-India bias in coverage of the Kashmir Conflict, the Hyde Act and other India-related matters.

In 2010, the Huffington Post charged that The New York Times is Indophobic and promotes neocolonialism with its slanted and negative coverage. United States lawmaker Kumar P. Barve described a recent editorial on India as full of "blatant and unprofessional factual errors or omissions" having a "haughty, condescending, arrogant and patronizing" tone.

In September 2014, the Indian Space Research Organization (ISRO) successfully placed a spacecraft into orbit around the planet Mars, thereby completing the Mars Orbiter Mission. CNN reported this as a "groundbreaking Mars mission", making India the first nation to arrive on its first attempt and the first Asian country to reach Mars. A few days later, The New York Times published a cartoon on this event, showing a turban-wearing man with a cow knocking at the door of an "elite space club". The Huffington Post said that the cartoon was in "poor taste" and "the racial, national and classist stereotyping is apparent". The New York Times subsequently published an apology saying that a "large number of readers have complained" about the cartoon and that they "apologize to readers who were offended".

In June 2016, the New York Times published an editorial opposing India's entry into the Nuclear Suppliers Group (NSG). During this time, the US administration led by President Barack Obama was actively supporting India's membership. The paper said the membership was "not merited" and that India had "fallen far short" in assuming responsibilities of a nuclear nation. This view was criticized by several western and Indian experts on nuclear issues. Ramesh Thakur, Director of the Centre for Nuclear Non-Proliferation and Disarmament at the Australian National University, said The New York Times is "frequently chauvinistic" and that the editorial "reflects a deliberate bias". Alyssa Ayres, a senior fellow for South Asia at the Council on Foreign Relations, rebutted the editorial, saying  "the small community of India-watchers in Washington read these words in disbelief" and the paper "should ground its arguments in an appraisal of the complete facts".

In November 2017, the New York Times published an article by Asgar Qadri attacking the Indian sari as a "conspiracy by Hindu Nationalists". The article was widely lambasted on social media for associating a common Indian dress with religious prejudice and communalism. In addition, the article was heavily criticized by several Indian journalists, such as Barkha Dutt, who called it "daft commentary" and a "gross misrepresentation of what the sari means to us", and the notion that the sari is exclusively a Hindu dress as "utter nonsense". Others criticized the New York Times for promoting colonial racist stereotypes, and pointed out that the sari is also popular in Muslim-majority countries like Bangladesh.

Pakistani media
Pakistani media commentators such as Zaid Hamid were accused by other Pakistanis of promoting Indophobia. In an editorial published in Daily Times Tayyab Shah accused him of acting at the behest of the Pakistani security establishment and condemned his views. Along with Lashkar-e-Taiba he is one of the main proponents in present-day Pakistan of Ghazwatul Hind, a battle where Muslims will conquer India and establish Sharia rule according to a Hadith.

Talking to reporters after inaugurating an exhibition in Lahore, Majid Nizami, the chief editor of Nawa-i-Waqt, stated "freedom is the greatest blessing of the Almighty, Who may save us from dominance of Hindus, as our sworn enemy India is bent upon destroying Pakistan. However, if it did not refrain from committing aggression against us, then Pakistan is destined to defeat India because our horses in the form of atomic bombs and missiles are far better than Indian 'donkeys'."

Some of the anti-India propaganda is claimed to be driven by the Pakistani military. In December 2010 many Pakistani newspapers published reports based on United States diplomatic cables leaks which portrayed India in a negative light. The Guardian reported that none of the information reported by Pakistani media could be verified in its database of leaked cables. Thereafter several newspapers apologized. The fake cables were believed to have been planted by Inter-Services Intelligence.

Slumdog Millionaire

The Indo-British film Slumdog Millionaire was the subject of many controversies in terms of its title, its depiction of Indian slums and its language use. The film's title was consistently challenged for having the word "dog" in it. The protest took place in Patna where it was written on a signboard "I Am Not a Dog". Activists stated that slum dwellers would continue to protest until the film's director deleted the word "dog" from the title.

Co-director Loveleen Tandan was too criticized by producer Christian Colson. Colson defined her partnership with Boyle a mismatch.  Colson noted that the title of "co-director (India)" given to Tandan was "strange but deserved" and was developed over "a Coca Cola and a cup of tea" in order to identify her as "one of our key cultural bridges." During the 2009 Oscar awards ceremony, Tandan was ignored and all credit for the film was taken by Boyle.
Some filmmakers and actors from Bollywood were also critical of Slumdog Millionaire including Aamir Khan, Priyadarshan and Music Director Aadesh Shrivastava.

See also 

Anti-Bengali sentiment in India
 2008 bombing of Indian embassy in Kabul
 Anti-Brahminism
 Anti-Hindu sentiment
 Anti-Pakistan sentiment
 Anti-Romani sentiment
 Barbara Crossette
 Criticism of Buddhism
 Criticism of Hinduism
 Criticism of Sikhism
 List of ethnic slurs
 Persecution of Buddhists
 Persecution of Hindus
 :Category:Persecution of Sikhs

References 

 Sources

Further reading 
 Idi Amin & Indophobia: General Amin and the Indian Exodus from Uganda by Hasu H. Patel, Issue: A Journal of Opinion, Vol. 2, No. 4 (Winter, 1972), pp. 12–22. 
 
K.K. Aziz. (2004) The Murder of History: A Critique of History Textbooks used in Pakistan. Vanguard. 
Nayyar, A. H. & Salim, Ahmad. (2003) The Subtle Subversion: The State of Curricula and Text-books in Pakistan - Urdu, English, Social Studies and Civics. Sustainable Development Policy Institute. The Subtle Subversion
Rosser, Yvette Claire (2003). Islamization of Pakistani Social Studies Textbooks. New Delhi: Rupa & Co. .
Rosser, Yvette Claire (2004). Indoctrinating Minds: Politics of Education in Bangladesh. New Delhi: Rupa & Co. .

External links 

 "Islamic Resurgence in Bangladesh: Genesis, Dynamics and Implications". by Taj I. Hashmi, Asia-Pacific Center for Security Studies.
 "Terror sans Frontiers: Islamic Militancy in North East India". by Jaideep Saikia, University of Illinois at Urbana–Champaign, July 2003.
 "What does 'anti-Indian' mean?". by Zafar Sobhan, The Sunday Guardian.
 "Australia and anti-Indian violence", The Economist, 18 June 2009.
 "America's New Anti-India Backlash". by David J. Karl, Bloomberg Businessweek, 13 May 2010.
 "Religion and Anti-Indianism in Pakistan" by Yoginder Sikand, New Age Islam, 31 December 2010.
 "Bangladesh's anti-Indian gun running and insurgent havens persist". by Dr. Subhash Kapila, South Asia Analysis Group, 29 April 2004.
 "Why are some Bangladeshis anti-Indian?" by Habibul Haque Khondker, The Daily Star, 24 July 2009.
 "Rethinking anti-Indianism in Nepal" by Trailokya Raj Aryal, MyRepublica, 25 April 2010.
 "Increasing Anti-Indianism in Nepal: Myth or Reality". Telegraphnepal.com.
 "India can afford anti-Indianism". by S. Prasannarajan, India Today, 10 December 2010.

 
India–Pakistan relations
Indology
Indian
India